Prince Friedrich Wilhelm of Prussia (12 July 18809 March 1925) was a member of the House of Hohenzollern, great-grandson of King Frederick William III of Prussia.

Early life and education
Friedrich Wilhelm was born at Kamenz Palace in Kamenz, Kingdom of Prussia, (now Kamieniec Ząbkowicki, Poland) youngest child of Prince Albert of Prussia (1837–1906), (son of Prince Albert of Prussia and Princess Marianne of the Netherlands) and his wife, Princess Marie of Saxe-Altenburg (1854–1898), (daughter of Ernst I, Duke of Saxe-Altenburg and Princess Agnes of Anhalt-Dessau). He was great-grandson of King Frederick William III of Prussia and  King William I of the Netherlands. He was second cousin of Wilhelm II, German Emperor.

During his youth, he spent time in Berlin, also at his grandmother's Reinhartshausen Castle in Erbach and in Brunswick, where his father served as regent. A few years later he studied law at the University of Bonn, where he received the degree of Doctor of Philosophy. His main interests were in literature and music.

Political career
After marriage, the Prince lived with his wife in Rudy. In 1912, was elected Landrat of Frankenstein District, where it remained until 1918, until the abolition of the German monarchy and the establishment of the Weimar Republic. Previously, he participated actively in hostilities during the First World War, for which he was promoted to the rank of major general. Much of the time he traveled through Europe and the world, sometimes in important diplomatic missions, representing Emperor Wilhelm II. Sensing the fall of the monarchy in Germany, at the end of the war, he took up for discussion and exchange views with university professors on the reconstruction of the existing system of government, proposing the introduction of a constitutional monarchy modeled on the form of government of the United Kingdom.

In 1918, he was considered for the office of the King of Finland. However, his wife's Catholicism prevented this, and the Finns chose Prince Frederick Charles of Hesse (who was Lutheran as was his wife) instead.

After the war and the establishment of the republic in Germany, Friedrich Wilhelm became involved with the monarchists, proposing the restoration of the German Empire. He was determined to take over the role of regent until the heir to the throne reached the age of majority. He died in 1925, aged 44 in Weisser Hirsch, a residential district in Dresden.

Marriage and issue
Friedrich Wilhelm married 8 June 1910 at Potsdam to Princess Agathe Charlotte Pauline Marie of Hohenlohe-Waldenburg-Schillingsfürst (1888–1960), daughter of Victor II, Duke of Ratibor, and his wife, Countess Maria Breunner-Enkevoirth.

They had four daughters:
Princess Marie Therese of Prussia (2 May 1911– 3 January 2005), married in 1932 to Aloys Rudolph Hug, had issue.
Princess Luise Henriette of Prussia (21 July 1912 – 12 October 1973), married in 1936 to Wilhelm Schmalz, had issue.
Princess Marianne of Prussia (23 August 1913 – 1 March 1983), married in 1933 to Prince Wilhelm of Hesse-Philippsthal-Barchfeld, had issue.
Princess Elisabeth of Prussia (9 February 1919 – 24 August 1961), married in 1948 to Heinz Mees, no issue.

Honours and awards
He received the following decorations:

Ancestry

Notes and sources

L'Allemagne dynastique, Huberty, Giraud, Magdelaine, Reference: vol V page 242
The Royal House of Stuart, London, 1969, 1971, 1976, Addington, A. C., Reference: page 298.

1880 births
1925 deaths
People from Ząbkowice Śląskie County
People from the Province of Silesia
Friedrich Wilhelm
Friedrich Wilhelm
Major generals of Prussia
Recipients of the Iron Cross (1914), 2nd class
German Army generals of World War I